Men's Giant Slalom World Cup 2000/2001

Final point standings

In Men's Giant Slalom World Cup 2000/2001 all results count.

Note:

In the last race only the best racers were allowed to compete and only the best 15 finishers were awarded with points.

References
 fis-ski.com

World Cup
FIS Alpine Ski World Cup men's giant slalom discipline titles